For the theater that was once in New York City see Fourteenth Street Theatre

The 14th Street Theatre, located at 2037 E. 14th Street in downtown Cleveland, Ohio, United States, was a 288-seat theater built in 2002 as part of Playhouse Square.  Originally built for Second City Cleveland, the theater closed in 2013 and is now Cibreo Privato, the private dining space for the Italian restaurant Cibreo, owned and operated by Driftwood Restaurant Group.

References

Theatres in Cleveland
Culture of Cleveland